Resistance and Liberation Day (Arabic:عيد المقاومة والتحرير, Yawm al-Muqawamat Waltahrir) is a Lebanese holiday celebrated on May 25.

On May 25, 2000, the Israeli army withdrew from territory in Southern Lebanon, marking the end of the South Lebanon conflict (1985–2000). The withdrawal came after the continued attack on Israeli military positions in occupied Lebanese territory by Hezbollah forced Israeli forces to withdraw. It is celebrated as an important day in the history of Lebanon. The United Nations certified that the withdrawal was complete, with troops having left territory demarcated by the Blue Line. Lebanon disputed the completion of withdrawal, claiming that the Blue Line did not match with its international borders in a region between it and Syria called the Shebaa Farms. After the Israeli withdrawal the South Lebanon Army, a militia occupying southern Lebanon, collapsed entirely with Hezbollah rapidly advancing and occupying the territory that Israel had withdrawn from. Right after the Israeli's had retreated, Lebanese prime minister Salim al-Hoss declared a public holiday on May 25th to commemorate the end of the occupation.

Celebrations 
The holiday is celebrated with parades, rallies, ceremonies, political marches, and speeches especially in the south of Lebanon where the people were most effected by the invasion. It is also celebrated by reconstruction projects in the region, for instance, Lebanese politicians commemorated the occasion in 2007 by announcing the rebuilding of the Zahrani Bridge, a crucial transportation connection devastated in an Israeli bombing in July 2006.

See also
South Lebanon conflict (1982–2000)
Israeli-Lebanese conflict
Liberation Day in other countries
Shebaa farms

References

Remembrance days
Public holidays in Lebanon
Israeli–Lebanese conflict
May observances